Usha Kiron Movies is an Indian film production company founded by Ramoji Rao in 1983. It is a part of Ramoji Group. This film production house has produced over 80 films with the majority of them in Telugu, along with a few in Kannada, Hindi and other languages.

History
The production house is known for giving opportunity to young talent and produced many content-oriented films under Usha Kiron Movies banner. The production company started with the film Srivariki Premalekha (1984).

Partial filmography

TV serials

Associated talent 
This is a list of notable people introduced by Usha Kiron Movies.

Awards

References 

Film production companies based in Hyderabad, India
Mass media companies established in 1983
Ramoji Group
Indian companies established in 1983
1983 establishments in Andhra Pradesh